I Wanna Go There is the third studio album by American singer Tyrese. It was released on December 17, 2002 through J Records. This became his first album to be released on J Records after recording two albums for his previous label RCA Records. The production on the album was handled by multiple producers including The Underdogs, Bryan-Michael Cox, Johnny "J", Poke & Tone and Jermaine Dupri. The album also features a guest appearance by Dupri and Mos Def.

I Wanna Go There was supported by two singles: "How You Gonna Act Like That" and "Signs of Love Makin'". The album was a slow commercial success. It peaked at number 16 on the US Billboard 200 chart and number two on the US Top R&B/Hip-Hop Albums chart. It was also certified gold by the Recording Industry Association of America (RIAA) in February 2003.

Singles
The album's first single, "How You Gonna Act Like That", was released as the album's lead single on November 19, 2002. The single peaked at number seven on the US Billboard Hot 100 chart dated March 29, 2003, becoming the album's most successful single and Tyrese's highest-charting song on the chart. The album's second single, "Signs of Love Makin'" was released later that year. The second single peaked at number 57 on the chart dated August 30, 2003.

Commercial performance
I Wanna Go There debuted at number 69 on the US Billboard 200, on the chart week dated January 4, 2003. After its tenth week on the chart, the album reached it peak at number 16 on the chart dated March 8, 2003. The album also peaked at number two on the US Top R&B/Hip-Hop Albums chart dated February 22, 2003. The album also spent a total of 35 weeks on the Billboard 200. On February 14, 2003, the album was certified gold by the Recording Industry Association of America (RIAA) for shipments of over 500,000 copies. As of June 2006, the album has sold 877,000 copies in the United States, according to Nielsen Soundscan.

Track listing

Samples
"How Do You Want It (Situations)" contains interpolations from the composition "How Do U Want It" by Tupac Shakur and Quincy Jones's "Body Heat".

Charts

Weekly charts

Year-end charts

Certifications

References

External links
[ I Wanna Go There] at Allmusic

2002 albums
Tyrese Gibson albums
J Records albums
Albums produced by Bryan-Michael Cox
Albums produced by Jermaine Dupri
Albums produced by the Underdogs (production team)